Malapterus reticulatus is a species of wrasse endemic to the Juan Fernández Islands in the southeastern Pacific Ocean. It is a cleaner of species in the genus Scorpis, eating the isopod ectoparasites in their mouths. This species is the only known member of its genus. It is found in shallow, coastal waters over rocky reefs.

References

Labridae
Taxa named by Achille Valenciennes
Fish described in 1839
Endemic fauna of Chile